Madison Time is an album recorded by American jazz pianist Ray Bryant recorded in 1959 and 1960 for the Columbia label. The album was released following the success of the Madison dance craze single "The Madison Time" which reached number 30 on the Billboard chart and number 5 on the R&B chart. The single also featured in the soundtrack to the 1988 film Hairspray.

Reception

Allmusic awarded the album 3 stars calling it "Ray Bryant's most popular album".

Track listing
All compositions by Ray Bryant except as indicated
 "The Madison Time - Part I" (Ray Bryant, Eddie Morrison) - 3:06  
 "The Madison Time - Part II" (Bryant, Morrison) - 2:48  
 "Centerpiece" (Harry Edison) - 4:22  
 "Split T - Part I" - 4:02  
 "Split T - Part II" - 5:20  
 "Hit It! - Part I" - 3:15  
 "Hit It! - Part II" - 4:10  
 "Young Buddy" - 4:03  
 "The Huckle-Buck" (Roy Alfred & Andy Gibson) - 5:09  
Recorded on March 16, 1959 (tracks 1 & 2), March 20, 1960 (tracks 3, 8 & 9), and July 12, 1960 (tracks 4-7)

Personnel 
Ray Bryant - piano
Harry Edison - trumpet
Al Grey (tracks 4-7), Urbie Green (tracks 1 & 2), Benny Morton (tracks 3, 8 & 9) - trombone
Buddy Tate - tenor saxophone
Tommy Bryant - bass
Billy English (tracks 1 & 2), Jimmy Griffin (tracks 3, 8 & 9), Dave Pochonet (tracks 4-7) - drums
Eddie Morrison - caller (tracks 1, 4 & 6)

References 

1960 albums
Ray Bryant albums
Columbia Records albums